Mirah (formerly Duby) has been a programming language based on Ruby language syntax, local type inference, hybrid static–dynamic type system, and a pluggable compiler toolchain. Mirah was created by Charles Oliver Nutter to be "a 'Ruby-like' language, probably a subset of Ruby syntax, that [could] compile to solid, fast, idiomatic JVM bytecode." The word  refers to the gemstone ruby in the Javanese language, a play on the concept of Ruby in Java.

History 

To foster more participation in the JRuby project from Ruby community members, Nutter began to explore the possibility of presenting Ruby syntax, but with a static type model and direct-to-native compiling. In this context, "native" meant mainly the Java virtual machine (JVM), but Mirah has been designed around the possibility of having alternative backends for other object-oriented runtimes like the Common Language Runtime (CLR) of the .NET Framework. The language needed to look and feel like Ruby, and to introduce no new library dependencies into JRuby (which precludes most other JVM languages) and to suffer no performance penalty (which precludes writing in Ruby).

Early versions of Mirah (then Duby) focused mostly on mathematical performance, where dynamic programming languages often pay the highest cost. Since then it has evolved into a full JVM language, with several users and real-world applications using it for core components.

Design 

Mirah is mostly a pluggable compiler toolchain. The main elements of the chain are:

 A parser, based on JRuby's parser, that emits a Ruby abstract syntax tree (AST)
 A transformer that converts the Ruby AST into a Mirah AST
 A type inferrer that decorates the Mirah AST with appropriate typing information for the target backend
 A backend code generator

Of these phases, only the last two need specific knowledge of the eventual target platform. This makes Mirah suitable for many backends, and also makes it possible to write language plug-ins for Mirah's transformation phase that will apply to all supported backends equally.

For simple pieces of code and the JVM bytecode backend, the Mirah compiler emits nearly the same instructions as standard javac compilers.

No runtime library 

Because Mirah is just a compiler, it ships no standard library. The intent is that Mirah users will choose what libraries they want to use, perhaps write plugins for the Mirah compiler to support them, and the compiler will do the rest. This is an explicit design goal, avoid introducing a requirement on any new external library. The standard library for Mirah, then, is whatever the standard library for the current backend is, and emphasis is placed on writing compiler plugins rather than libraries to extend and enhance the language.

Type system 

Mirah does not impose a specific type system on users, instead relying on whatever the target backend provides. On the JVM, the type system is largely Java's type system, and type declarations refer to JVM classes, primitives, and interfaces.

Mirah is primarily a statically-typed language, but support is in development to allow dynamic typing also. The mechanism is similar to that provided in C# 4, with a special dynamic type indicating all dispatches against that variable's value should be done dynamically. Dynamic type support is currently planned only for Java 7 and higher, using the new invokedynamic bytecode.

Syntax 

The syntax of Mirah is largely the same as the syntax of Ruby, but with a few modifications to support static typing:

 Method parameters usually need to have their types declared:def foo(a:String, b:int)
 Because several transformations occur in the Mirah compiler toolchain, some strings that are valid identifiers in Ruby are treated as keywords in Mirah, such as the word interface used to specify a JVM-style interface.

Outside of these differences, Mirah code generally looks like Ruby code:
def fib(a:int)
  if a < 2
    a
  else
    fib(a - 1) + fib(a - 2)
  end
end

Status 

, Mirah is under development, but some developers are using Mirah for production applications of limited scope.

Frameworks

Dubious 
Dubious is a project for running Mirah on Google App Engine. It provides a way to build apps in Mirah, with conventions familiar to developers using Ruby on Rails and Sinatra. Since everything is compiled ahead-of-time, Mirah applications have none of the initializing costs associated with JRuby. Dubious supports ERuby (ERb) and has a simple datastore adapter that uses a syntax similar to Datamapper.

See also 

 List of JVM languages

References

External links 
 
 Introduction to Mirah by Charles Nutter - Dr. Dobb's, March 25, 2011
 Breaking the Rules - Making Java Fun with Mirah - Roja Buck, Mar 20, 2011
 A Blend of Java and Ruby - The Mirah Language - InfoQ, July 27, 2010
 Mirah brings Ruby niceties to Java - InfoWorld. July 23, 2010
 "Mirah: Taking Performance to the Next Level with Java's Ruby" - O'Reilly Media, July, 2010
 Introducing Duby, Ryan Brown
 "Ruby Mutants Presentation", Railsconf 2009
 Dubious framework
 Video presentation: JRuby, Duby, and Surinx: Building a Better Ruby
 Video Lightning talk: Rails Underground 2009 - Charles Nutter on Charles Nutter - Duby and Juby Languages
 What does Mirah offer over JRuby,Groovy and Scala?

JVM programming languages
Scripting languages
Object-oriented programming languages
Java programming language family
Software using the Apache license
Programming languages created in 2008